Sun Moon may refer to:
Abbreviation of Korean names with the surname Moon (문) and the generation name Sun (선, Seon):
Sun Myung Moon (1920–2012), founder of the Unification Church
Sun-hee Moon, South Korean voice actress
Sun Moon Lake, Yuchi, Nantou, Taiwan, Republic of China
Sun Moon University, Cheonan, South Korea
Pokémon Sun and Moon

See also
Sun and moon
Sun and moon letters in Arabic and Maltese